Ivan Tarek Fjellstad Näsberg (born 22 April 1996) is a Norwegian professional footballer who plays as a centre-back for Greek Super League club PAOK.

Career

Vålerenga

Ivan Näsberg was born in Vålerenga, grew up in Vålerenga, and apart from a year in Swedish Varbergs BoIS, he played his entire career in Vålerenga. In other words: He is a real Vålerenga boy. Ivan is a defensive player and is used both in center and as a left back.
Näsberg made his league debut in July 2013 against Viking.

Born in Oslo on April 22, 1996, he started playing football in Valerenga at the age of 5, a lifetime, he is in the same team doing all the steps from the bottom up.
Somehow he made his debut in the first division in 2013 at the age of just 17 years old. In his early seasons he did not play a significant role, but for the last four seasons he has established himself as a key player playing in 85 games out of a total of 141 appearances with the Oslo team jersey.With a height of 1.86m. Näsberg was on the transfer lists of Crystal Palace and Fulham, having stood out for his ability to "build" the game from the defense, with his appearances during that time not going unnoticed and the English press characterizing him "A very good solution at a low cost and with an eye on the future."

At that time the sale price was set at 1.2 million euros, around these numbers were traded by the people of Valerenga and Crystal Palace, however in the winter of 2021 the Londoners turned to other cases of defense and the issue of the Norwegian stopper remained aside.

PAOK
The Norwegian Ivan Näsberg comes with a free transfer, to sign for the Thessaloniki team of PAOK.

Career statistics

Club

References

1996 births
Living people
Footballers from Oslo
Norwegian footballers
Norway under-21 international footballers
Norway youth international footballers
Association football defenders
Vålerenga Fotball players
Varbergs BoIS players
Eliteserien players
Super League Greece players
PAOK FC players
Norwegian Second Division players
Superettan players
Norwegian expatriate footballers
Expatriate footballers in Sweden
Norwegian expatriate sportspeople in Sweden
Expatriate footballers in Greece
Norwegian expatriate sportspeople in Greece